Seven Standards and a Blues is the second album by American jazz saxophonist Ernie Henry featuring tracks recorded in 1957 for the Riverside label.

Reception

Allmusic awarded the album 3 stars with Scott Yanow stating "Recorded just three months before his unexpected death, this set by altoist Ernie Henry is his definitive album as a leader... Superior modern mainstream music, but there should have been much more from the potentially significant Ernie Henry".

Track listing
 "I Get a Kick Out of You" (Cole Porter) - 4:39    
 "My Ideal" (Newell Chase, Leo Robin, Richard A. Whiting) - 2:46    
 "I've Got the World on a String" (Harold Arlen, Ted Koehler) - 6:33    
 "Sweet Lorraine" (Cliff Burwell, Mitchell Parish) - 5:01    
 "Soon" (George Gershwin, Ira Gershwin) - 6:00    
 "Lover Man" (Jimmy Davis, Ram Ramirez, James Sherman) - 2:41    
 "Specific Gravity" (Ernie Henry) - 6:39    
 "Like Someone in Love" (Johnny Burke, Jimmy Van Heusen) - 5:14

Personnel 
Ernie Henry - alto saxophone
Wynton Kelly - piano
Wilbur Ware - bass
Philly Joe Jones - drums

References 

1957 albums
Ernie Henry albums
Albums produced by Orrin Keepnews
Riverside Records albums